Jen Sheen is a biologist at Massachusetts General Hospital and Harvard Medical School who is known for her work on plant signaling networks. She is an elected member of the American Association for the Advancement of Science

Education and career 
Sheen's interest in plants followed her childhood on a sugarcane plantation in rural Taiwan. She has a B.S. from National Taiwan University (1980) and earned a Ph.D. in 1986 from Harvard University where she worked with Lawrence Bogorad. Following her Ph.D., she received endowment funds that enabled her to start her own lab at Harvard Medical School in 1987 with flexibility that enabled her to define her own research path. She was promoted to professor of genetics in 2005. Concurrently she has held positions in molecular biology at Massachusetts General Hospital.

Research 
Sheen is known for her research using plants as model systems to study cell signaling. While a graduate student at Harvard University, she worked on the genetic system of maize with the goal of increasing crop yields. When starting her own lab, she established a model system using plant protoplasts, cells which can be maintained easily in laboratory containers. She then shifted her work to studying protoplasts in Arabidopsis, a plant commonly used as a model system, and Sheen has developed the use of green fluorescent protein in higher plant research. Sheen has used the plant protoplast model system to examine innate immunity, taking advantage of the plant system's ability to provide answers about innate immunity more rapidly than other systems in use. Sheen's research includes investigations into signaling pathways in plants, and has determined how plants sense sugars, and how stressors such as hydrogen peroxide are sensed by plants.

Selected publications

Awards and honors 
Sheen was elected a fellow of the American Association for the Advancement of Science in 2009. In 2013, she received the Martin Gibbs Medal from the American Society of Plant Biologists who acknowledge Sheen for "for her seminal and innovative contributions to the understanding of molecular mechanisms underlying the plant signal transduction cascades that mediate nutrient, hormone, and environmental stress responses and pathogen defenses in plants".

References

External links 
 

Fellows of the American Association for the Advancement of Science
Harvard University faculty
National Taiwan University alumni
Harvard University alumni
21st-century American botanists
Women geneticists
Living people
21st-century American women scientists
Year of birth missing (living people)